Itauçu is a municipality in central Goiás state, Brazil.

Location
Itauçu is located 64 km. northwest of the state capital, Goiânia and is part of the Anápolis Microregion.  It is connected to the capital by highway BR-070, which links Goiânia with Aragarças.
It has boundaries with the following municipalities:
north:  Taquaral de Goiás and Santa Rosa de Goiás
west:  Itaberaí
east:  Petrolina de Goiás
south:  Araçu and Inhumas

Demographics
Population growth rate 1991/2000: 0.24.%
Population in 2007: 8,710
Population in 1980: 9,770
Urban population in 2007: 6,404
Rural population in 2007: 2,306

The economy
The economy is based on cattle raising (49,000 head in 2004) and cultivation of soybeans, rice, corn, sugarcane, and beans.
Number of industrial establishments: 24
Number of retail establishments: 71
Banking establishments:  Banco Itaú S.A.
Dairies: Laticínios Alvorada Ind. Com. Ltda. (22/05/2006)
Automobiles:  757

Agricultural data 2006
Farms:  446
Total area:  41,650 ha.
Area of permanent crops: 21,088 ha. (bananas, sugarcane, citrus fruits)
Area of perennial crops: 3,555 ha.
Area of natural pasture:  3,618 ha.
Area of woodland and forests:  3,471 ha.
Persons dependent on farming:  1,000
Farms with tractors: 19
Number of tractors:  24
Cattle herd:  49,000 head IBGE

Health and education
In the educational sector there were 9 schools in activity in 2006, with 2,128 students.  The literacy rate was 85.1%.  In the health sector there was 1 hospital with 22 beds.  The infant mortality rate was 19.60 (in 1,000 live births)

Itauçu had a score of 0.742 (2000) on the Municipal Human Development Index giving a state ranking of 103 (out of 242 municipalities in 2000) and a national ranking of 2,118 (out of 5,507 municipalities in 2000).  For the complete list see frigoletto.com.br

Football

Founded on May 31, 1986, with the name of Associação Esportiva Itauçuense, in 2007 it was renamed Itauçu Esporte Clube is a football club that represents the city. In 2010, the weather changed from Ituaçu to Nerópolis and changed its name to Nerópolis Esporte Clube. But in 2014 he returned to his hometown, and played in the Campeonato Goiano (Third Division).

The team debuted professionally in 2006 at Campeonato Goiano (Third Division). The team, already in the debut season in professional football, reached the title by thrashing Tupy (de Jussara) in the final, 3x0. Altogether there were seven games with five wins, a draw and just one defeat. Highlight for Túlio Maravilha, top scorer of the competition with seven goals scored.

See also 
 List of municipalities in Goiás

References

Frigoletto

Municipalities in Goiás